

Year 503 (DIII) was a common year starting on Wednesday (link will display the full calendar) of the Julian calendar. At the time, it was known as the Year of the Consulship of Volusianus and Dixicrates (or, less frequently, year 1256 Ab urbe condita). The denomination 503 for this year has been used since the early medieval period, when the Anno Domini calendar era became the prevalent method in Europe for naming years.

Events 
 Byzantine Empire 

 War with Sassanid Persia: Emperor Anastasius I sends a Byzantine army (52,000 men) to Armenia, but is defeated. The Romans attempt an unsuccessful siege of the Persian-held city Amida, on the Tigris. King Kavadh I invades Osroene, and lays siege to the city of Edessa (Northern Mesopotamia).
 May – Areobindus, Byzantine general (magister militum), is stationed as commander at Dara, with an army of 12,000 men to keep watch at the Persian stronghold of Nisibis (modern Turkey).

 Palestine 

 Mundhir III, king of the Lakhmids (Arab Christians), raids Palaestina Salutaris and Arabia Petraea. He captures a large number of Romans.

 Europe 

 King Ernakh, third son of Attila the Hun, dies after a 34-year reign. He is succeeded by his two sons (Utigur and Kutrigur), who share the power with the unified Bulgars.

Births 
 October 17 – Lý Nam Đế, first emperor of Vietnam (d. 548)
 December 2 – Xiao Gang, later Emperor Jianwen of Liang, emperor of the Chinese Liang dynasty (killed 551) 
 Chen Baxian, later Emperor Wu of Chen, first emperor of the Chinese Chen dynasty (d. 559)

Deaths 
 Ernakh, king of the Huns

References 

Bibliography